Celina is an unincorporated community in Oil Township, Perry County, in the U.S. state of Indiana.

History
A post office was established at Celina in 1870, and remained in operation until 1940;  for most of this period, the post office was located in the Jacob Rickenbaugh House.  According to Ronald L. Baker, the community may be named after Celina, Ohio.

Geography

References

Unincorporated communities in Perry County, Indiana
Unincorporated communities in Indiana